Redhouse is a townland in County Kilkenny, Ireland located midway between the towns of Callan and Kilmanagh.

Redhouse is noted in historical records as having a well which was used by thousands during the Great Irish Famine as many other wells in the area had gone dry. To this is attributed a higher than average survival rate in the area during the famine.

See also
 List of towns and villages in Ireland

References

Townlands of County Kilkenny